Jerry Reitman (born January 9, 1938) is an American author, businessman and advertising executive. Reitman is the founder of the Reitman Group. He formerly worked for American Express, served as the vice president of marketing for the CBS Columbia House division, served as the CEO of Scali, McCabe, Sloves, the International Head and Executive Vice President of Ogilvy, and the Executive Vice President of Leo Burnett Worldwide.

Early life
Reitman was born to Benjamin and Ruth Reitman. He grew up in a Jewish family in Philadelphia, Pennsylvania. His father was the owner of multiple shoe retail stores. He graduated from Abraham Lincoln High School and went on to attend Penn State where he graduated with a degree in finance.

Career
Reitman started his career at Ziff Davis as an ad salesman. While at Ziff Davis, he went on to become the director of their British Magazine of the Month Club. He then spent time working at Publishers Clearing House and Academic Media Company.

In 1974, Reitman became the International Head and Executive Vice President of Ogilvy and was successful in growing Oglivy from two offices to 26 offices over a four-year period. In 1982, Reitman was named the President and CEO of Scali, McCabe, Sloves where he was tasked with expanding the company. In 1985, Reitman became the Executive Vice President of Leo Burnett Worldwide. He retired from Leo Burnett after working there for 15 years.

Reitman published Beyond 2000: The Future of Direct Marketing in 2000. The book talks about the future of the direct marketing industry.

Awards
Reitman has received recognition and many awards for his successful work as an advertising executive. For example, the city of New Orleans, Louisiana gifted him with the key to the city. Other awards he has received include the Direct Marketers Silver Apple, the Charles S. Downs Award and the Direct Marketer of Year Award.

Charitable work
Reitman served as the chairman of the board of Governors at the Children's Miracle Network Hospitals for more than 20 years. As a result of his work with the Children's Miracle Network, he was invited to the White House in 2009 and met with President Barack Obama.

Personal life
Reitman is a resident of Chicago, Illinois. He also owns homes in Venice, California and Stockholm, Sweden. He is an avid tennis player and sports fan and an aspiring woodworker. His nephew is professional tennis player Oskar Wikberg.

References

1938 births
Living people
Businesspeople from Philadelphia
American advertising executives
Businesspeople from Chicago
20th-century American businesspeople
21st-century American businesspeople